A conspiracy theory is an explanation for an event or situation that asserts the existence of a conspiracy by powerful and sinister groups, often political in motivation, when other explanations are more probable. The term generally has a negative connotation, implying that the appeal of a conspiracy theory is based in prejudice, emotional conviction, or insufficient evidence. A conspiracy theory is distinct from a conspiracy; it refers to a hypothesized conspiracy with specific characteristics, including but not limited to opposition to the mainstream consensus among those who are qualified to evaluate its accuracy, such as scientists or historians.

Conspiracy theories are generally designed to resist falsification and are reinforced by circular reasoning: both evidence against the conspiracy and absence of evidence for it are misinterpreted as evidence of its truth, whereby the conspiracy becomes a matter of faith rather than something that can be proven or disproven. Studies have linked belief in conspiracy theories to distrust of authority and political cynicism. Some researchers suggest that conspiracist ideation—belief in conspiracy theories—may be psychologically harmful or pathological, and that it is correlated with lower analytical thinking, low intelligence, psychological projection, paranoia, and Machiavellianism. Psychologists usually attribute belief in conspiracy theories to a number of psychopathological conditions such as paranoia, schizotypy, narcissism, and insecure attachment, or to a form of cognitive bias called "illusory pattern perception". However, a 2020 review article found that most cognitive scientists view conspiracy theorizing as typically nonpathological, given that unfounded belief in conspiracy is common across cultures both historical and contemporary, and may arise from innate human tendencies towards gossip, group cohesion, and religion.

Historically, conspiracy theories have been closely linked to prejudice, propaganda, witch hunts, wars, and genocides. They are often strongly believed by the perpetrators of terrorist attacks, and were used as justification by Timothy McVeigh and Anders Breivik, as well as by governments such as Nazi Germany, the Soviet Union, and Turkey. AIDS denialism by the government of South Africa, motivated by conspiracy theories, caused an estimated 330,000 deaths from AIDS, QAnon and denialism about the 2020 United States presidential election results led to the January 6 United States Capitol attack, while belief in conspiracy theories about genetically modified foods led the government of Zambia to reject food aid during a famine, at a time when three million people in the country were suffering from hunger. Conspiracy theories are a significant obstacle to improvements in public health, encouraging opposition to vaccination and water fluoridation among others, and have been linked to outbreaks of vaccine-preventable diseases. Other effects of conspiracy theories include reduced trust in scientific evidence, radicalization and ideological reinforcement of extremist groups, and negative consequences for the economy.

Conspiracy theories once limited to fringe audiences have become commonplace in mass media, the internet, and social media, emerging as a cultural phenomenon of the late 20th and early 21st centuries. They are widespread around the world and are often commonly believed, some even being held by the majority of the population. Interventions to reduce the occurrence of conspiracy beliefs include maintaining an open society and improving the analytical thinking skills of the general public.

Origin and Usage 
The Oxford English Dictionary defines conspiracy theory as "the theory that an event or phenomenon occurs as a result of a conspiracy between interested parties; spec. a belief that some covert but influential agency (typically political in motivation and oppressive in intent) is responsible for an unexplained event." It cites a 1909 article in The American Historical Review as the earliest usage example, although it also appeared in print for several decades before.

The earliest known usage was by the American author Charles Astor Bristed, in a letter to the editor published in The New York Times on January 11, 1863. He used it to refer to claims that British aristocrats were intentionally weakening the United States during the American Civil War in order to advance their financial interests.

The word "conspiracy" derives from the Latin con- ("with, together") and spirare ("to breathe").

Robert Blaskiewicz comments that examples of the term were used as early as the nineteenth century and states that its usage has always been derogatory. According to a study by Andrew McKenzie-McHarg, in contrast, in the nineteenth century the term conspiracy theory simply "suggests a plausible postulate of a conspiracy" and "did not, at this stage, carry any connotations, either negative or positive", though sometimes a postulate so-labeled was criticized.

The term "conspiracy theory" is itself the subject of a conspiracy theory, which posits that the term was popularized by the CIA in order to discredit conspiratorial believers, particularly critics of the Warren Commission, by making them a target of ridicule. In his 2013 book Conspiracy Theory in America, political scientist Lance deHaven-Smith wrote that the term entered everyday language in the United States after 1964, the year in which the Warren Commission published its findings on the Kennedy assassination, with The New York Times running five stories that year using the term. 

The idea that the CIA was responsible for popularising the term “conspiracy theory” was analyzed by Michael Butter, a Professor of American Literary and Cultural History at the University of Tübingen. Butter wrote in 2020 that the CIA document, Concerning Criticism of the Warren Report, which proponents of the theory use as evidence of CIA motive and intention, does not contain the phrase "conspiracy theory" in the singular, and only uses the term "conspiracy theories" once, in the sentence: "Conspiracy theories have frequently thrown suspicion on our organisation , for example, by falsely alleging that Lee Harvey Oswald worked for us."

Difference from conspiracy
A conspiracy theory is not simply a conspiracy, which refers to any covert plan involving two or more people. In contrast, the term "conspiracy theory" refers to hypothesized conspiracies that have specific characteristics. For example, conspiracist beliefs invariably oppose the mainstream consensus among those people who are qualified to evaluate their accuracy, such as scientists or historians. Conspiracy theorists see themselves as having privileged access to socially persecuted knowledge or a stigmatized mode of thought that separates them from the masses who believe the official account. Michael Barkun describes a conspiracy theory as a "template imposed upon the world to give the appearance of order to events".

Real conspiracies, even very simple ones, are difficult to conceal and routinely experience unexpected problems. In contrast, conspiracy theories suggest that conspiracies are unrealistically successful and that groups of conspirators, such as bureaucracies, can act with near-perfect competence and secrecy. The causes of events or situations are simplified to exclude complex or interacting factors, as well as the role of chance and unintended consequences. Nearly all observations are explained as having been deliberately planned by the alleged conspirators.

In conspiracy theories, the conspirators are usually claimed to be acting with extreme malice. As described by Robert Brotherton:

Examples

A conspiracy theory may take any matter as its subject, but certain subjects attract greater interest than others. Favored subjects include famous deaths and assassinations, morally dubious government activities, suppressed technologies, and "false flag" terrorism. Among the longest-standing and most widely recognized conspiracy theories are notions concerning the assassination of John F. Kennedy, the 1969 Apollo moon landings, and the 9/11 terrorist attacks, as well as numerous theories pertaining to alleged plots for world domination by various groups, both real and imaginary.

Popularity
Conspiracy beliefs are widespread around the world. In rural Africa, common targets of conspiracy theorizing include societal elites, enemy tribes, and the Western world, with conspirators often alleged to enact their plans via sorcery or witchcraft; one common belief identifies modern technology as itself being a form of sorcery, created with the goal of harming or controlling the people. In China, one widely published conspiracy theory claims that a number of events including the rise of Hitler, the 1997 Asian financial crisis, and climate change were planned by the Rothschild family, which may have led to effects on discussions about China's currency policy.

Conspiracy theories once limited to fringe audiences have become commonplace in mass media, contributing to conspiracism emerging as a cultural phenomenon in the United States of the late 20th and early 21st centuries. The general predisposition to believe conspiracy theories cuts across partisan and ideological lines. Conspiratorial thinking is correlated with antigovernmental orientations and a low sense of political efficacy, with conspiracy believers perceiving a governmental threat to individual rights and displaying a deep skepticism that who one votes for really matters.

Conspiracy theories are often commonly believed, some even being held by the majority of the population. A broad cross-section of Americans today gives credence to at least some conspiracy theories. For instance, a study conducted in 2016 found that 10% of Americans think the chemtrail conspiracy theory is "completely true" and 20–30% think it is "somewhat true". This puts "the equivalent of 120 million Americans in the 'chemtrails are real' camp." Belief in conspiracy theories has therefore become a topic of interest for sociologists, psychologists and experts in folklore.

Conspiracy theories are widely present on the Web in the form of blogs and YouTube videos, as well as on social media. Whether the Web has increased the prevalence of conspiracy theories or not is an open research question. The presence and representation of conspiracy theories in search engine results has been monitored and studied, showing significant variation across different topics, and a general absence of reputable, high-quality links in the results.

One conspiracy theory that propagated through former US President Barack Obama's time in office claimed that he was born in Kenya, instead of Hawaii where he was actually born. Former governor of Arkansas and political opponent of Obama Mike Huckabee made headlines in 2011 when he, among other members of Republican leadership, continued to question Obama's citizenship status.

Types
A conspiracy theory can be local or international, focused on single events or covering multiple incidents and entire countries, regions and periods of history. According to Russell Muirhead and Nancy Rosenblum, historically, traditional conspiracism has entailed a "theory", but over time, "conspiracy" and "theory" have become decoupled, as modern conspiracism is often without any kind of theory behind it.

Walker's five kinds
Jesse Walker (2013) has identified five kinds of conspiracy theories:

 The "Enemy Outside" refers to theories based on figures alleged to be scheming against a community from without.
 The "Enemy Within" finds the conspirators lurking inside the nation, indistinguishable from ordinary citizens.
 The "Enemy Above" involves powerful people manipulating events for their own gain.
 The "Enemy Below" features the lower classes working to overturn the social order.
 The "Benevolent Conspiracies" are angelic forces that work behind the scenes to improve the world and help people.

Barkun's three types
Michael Barkun has identified three classifications of conspiracy theory:

 Event conspiracy theories. This refers to limited and well-defined events. Examples may include such conspiracies theories as those concerning the Kennedy assassination, 9/11, and the spread of AIDS.
 Systemic conspiracy theories. The conspiracy is believed to have broad goals, usually conceived as securing control of a country, a region, or even the entire world. The goals are sweeping, whilst the conspiratorial machinery is generally simple: a single, evil organization implements a plan to infiltrate and subvert existing institutions. This is a common scenario in conspiracy theories that focus on the alleged machinations of Jews, Freemasons, Communism, or the Catholic Church.
 Superconspiracy theories. For Barkun, such theories link multiple alleged conspiracies together hierarchically. At the summit is a distant but all-powerful evil force. His cited examples are the ideas of David Icke and Milton William Cooper.

Rothbard: shallow vs. deep
Murray Rothbard argues in favor of a model that contrasts "deep" conspiracy theories to "shallow" ones. According to Rothbard, a "shallow" theorist observes an event and asks Cui bono? ("Who benefits?"), jumping to the conclusion that a posited beneficiary is responsible for covertly influencing events. On the other hand, the "deep" conspiracy theorist begins with a hunch and then seeks out evidence. Rothbard describes this latter activity as a matter of confirming with certain facts one's initial paranoia.

Lack of evidence
Belief in conspiracy theories is generally based not on evidence, but in the faith of the believer. Noam Chomsky contrasts conspiracy theory to institutional analysis which focuses mostly on the public, long-term behavior of publicly known institutions, as recorded in, for example, scholarly documents or mainstream media reports. Conspiracy theory conversely posits the existence of secretive coalitions of individuals and speculates on their alleged activities. Belief in conspiracy theories is associated with biases in reasoning, such as the conjunction fallacy.

Clare Birchall at King's College London describes conspiracy theory as a "form of popular knowledge or interpretation". The use of the word 'knowledge' here suggests ways in which conspiracy theory may be considered in relation to legitimate modes of knowing. The relationship between legitimate and illegitimate knowledge, Birchall claims, is closer than common dismissals of conspiracy theory contend.

Theories involving multiple conspirators that are proven to be correct, such as the Watergate scandal, are usually referred to as investigative journalism or historical analysis rather than conspiracy theory. By contrast, the term "Watergate conspiracy theory" is used to refer to a variety of hypotheses in which those convicted in the conspiracy were in fact the victims of a deeper conspiracy. There are also attempts to analyze the theory of conspiracy theories (conspiracy theory theory) to ensure that the term "conspiracy theory" is used to refer to narratives that have been debunked by experts, rather than as a generalized dismissal.

Rhetoric

Conspiracy theory rhetoric exploits several important cognitive biases, including proportionality bias, attribution bias, and confirmation bias. Their arguments often take the form of asking reasonable questions, but without providing an answer based on strong evidence. Conspiracy theories are most successful when proponents can gather followers from the general public, such as in politics, religion and journalism. These proponents may not necessarily believe the conspiracy theory; instead, they may just use it in an attempt to gain public approval. Conspiratorial claims can act as a successful rhetorical strategy to convince a portion of the public via appeal to emotion.

Conspiracy theories typically justify themselves by focusing on gaps or ambiguities in knowledge, and then arguing that the true explanation for this must be a conspiracy. In contrast, any evidence that directly supports their claims is generally of low quality. For example, conspiracy theories are often dependent on eyewitness testimony, despite its unreliability, while disregarding objective analyses of the evidence.

Conspiracy theories are not able to be falsified and are reinforced by fallacious arguments. In particular, the logical fallacy circular reasoning is used by conspiracy theorists: both evidence against the conspiracy and an absence of evidence for it are re-interpreted as evidence of its truth, whereby the conspiracy becomes a matter of faith rather than something that can be proved or disproved. The epistemic strategy of conspiracy theories has been called "cascade logic": each time new evidence becomes available, a conspiracy theory is able to dismiss it by claiming that even more people must be part of the cover-up. Any information that contradicts the conspiracy theory is suggested to be disinformation by the alleged conspiracy. Similarly, the continued lack of evidence directly supporting conspiracist claims is portrayed as confirming the existence of a conspiracy of silence; the fact that other people have not found or exposed any conspiracy is taken as evidence that those people are part of the plot, rather than considering that it may be because no conspiracy exists. This strategy lets conspiracy theories insulate themselves from neutral analyses of the evidence, and makes them resistant to questioning or correction, which is called "epistemic self-insulation".

Conspiracy theorists often take advantage of false balance in the media. They may claim to be presenting a legitimate alternative viewpoint that deserves equal time to argue its case; for example, this strategy has been used by the Teach the Controversy campaign to promote intelligent design, which often claims that there is a conspiracy of scientists suppressing their views. If they successfully find a platform to present their views in a debate format, they focus on using rhetorical ad hominems and attacking perceived flaws in the mainstream account, while avoiding any discussion of the shortcomings in their own position.

The typical approach of conspiracy theories is to challenge any action or statement from authorities, using even the most tenuous justifications. Responses are then assessed using a double standard, where failing to provide an immediate response to the satisfaction of the conspiracy theorist will be claimed to prove a conspiracy. Any minor errors in the response are heavily emphasized, while deficiencies in the arguments of other proponents are generally excused.

In science, conspiracists may suggest that a scientific theory can be disproven by a single perceived deficiency, even though such events are extremely rare. In addition, both disregarding the claims and attempting to address them will be interpreted as proof of a conspiracy. Other conspiracist arguments may not be scientific; for example, in response to the IPCC Second Assessment Report in 1996, much of the opposition centered on promoting a procedural objection to the report's creation. Specifically, it was claimed that part of the procedure reflected a conspiracy to silence dissenters, which served as motivation for opponents of the report and successfully redirected a significant amount of the public discussion away from the science.

Consequences

Historically, conspiracy theories have been closely linked to prejudice, witch hunts, wars, and genocides. They are often strongly believed by the perpetrators of terrorist attacks, and were used as justification by Timothy McVeigh, Anders Breivik and Brenton Tarrant, as well as by governments such as Nazi Germany and the Soviet Union. AIDS denialism by the government of South Africa, motivated by conspiracy theories, caused an estimated 330,000 deaths from AIDS, while belief in conspiracy theories about genetically modified foods led the government of Zambia to reject food aid during a famine, at a time when 3 million people in the country were suffering from hunger.

Conspiracy theories are a significant obstacle to improvements in public health. People who believe in health-related conspiracy theories are less likely to follow medical advice, and more likely to use alternative medicine instead. Conspiratorial anti-vaccination beliefs, such as conspiracy theories about pharmaceutical companies, can result in reduced vaccination rates and have been linked to outbreaks of vaccine-preventable diseases. Health-related conspiracy theories often inspire resistance to water fluoridation, and contributed to the impact of the Lancet MMR autism fraud.

Conspiracy theories are a fundamental component of a wide range of radicalized and extremist groups, where they may play an important role in reinforcing the ideology and psychology of their members as well as further radicalizing their beliefs. These conspiracy theories often share common themes, even among groups that would otherwise be fundamentally opposed, such as the antisemitic conspiracy theories found among political extremists on both the far right and far left. More generally, belief in conspiracy theories is associated with holding extreme and uncompromising viewpoints, and may help people in maintaining those viewpoints. While conspiracy theories are not always present in extremist groups, and do not always lead to violence when they are, they can make the group more extreme, provide an enemy to direct hatred towards, and isolate members from the rest of society. Conspiracy theories are most likely to inspire violence when they call for urgent action, appeal to prejudices, or demonize and scapegoat enemies.

Conspiracy theorizing in the workplace can also have economic consequences. For example, it leads to lower job satisfaction and lower commitment, resulting in workers being more likely to leave their jobs. Comparisons have also been made with the effects of workplace rumors, which share some characteristics with conspiracy theories and result in both decreased productivity and increased stress. Subsequent effects on managers include reduced profits, reduced trust from employees, and damage to the company's image.

Conspiracy theories can divert attention from important social, political, and scientific issues. In addition, they have been used to discredit scientific evidence to the general public or in a legal context. Conspiratorial strategies also share characteristics with those used by lawyers who are attempting to discredit expert testimony, such as claiming that the experts have ulterior motives in testifying, or attempting to find someone who will provide statements to imply that expert opinion is more divided than it actually is.

It is possible that conspiracy theories may also produce some compensatory benefits to society in certain situations. For example, they may help people identify governmental deceptions, particularly in repressive societies, and encourage government transparency. However, real conspiracies are normally revealed by people working within the system, such as whistleblowers and journalists, and most of the effort spent by conspiracy theorists is inherently misdirected. The most dangerous conspiracy theories are likely to be those that incite violence, scapegoat disadvantaged groups, or spread misinformation about important societal issues.

Interventions

The primary defense against conspiracy theories is to maintain an open society, in which many sources of reliable information are available, and government sources are known to be credible rather than propaganda. Additionally, independent nongovernmental organizations are able to correct misinformation without requiring people to trust the government. Other approaches to reduce the appeal of conspiracy theories in general among the public may be based in the emotional and social nature of conspiratorial beliefs. For example, interventions that promote analytical thinking in the general public are likely to be effective. Another approach is to intervene in ways that decrease negative emotions, and specifically to improve feelings of personal hope and empowerment.

Joseph Pierre has also noted that mistrust in authoritative institutions is the core component underlying many conspiracy theories and that this mistrust creates an epistemic vacuum and makes individuals searching for answers vulnerable to misinformation. Therefore, one possible solution is offering consumers a seat at the table to mend their mistrust in institutions. Regarding the challenges of this approach, Pierre has said, "The challenge with acknowledging areas of uncertainty within a public sphere is that doing so can be weaponized to reinforce a post-truth view of the world in which everything is debatable, and any counter-position is just as valid. Although I like to think of myself as a middle of the road kind of individual, it is important to keep in mind that the truth does not always lie in the middle of a debate, whether we are talking about climate change, vaccines, or antipsychotic medications."

It has been suggested that directly countering misinformation can be counterproductive. For example, since conspiracy theories can reinterpret disconfirming information as part of their narrative, refuting a claim can result in accidentally reinforcing it. In addition, publishing criticism of conspiracy theories can result in legitimizing them. In this context, possible interventions include carefully selecting which conspiracy theories to refute, requesting additional analyses from independent observers, and introducing cognitive diversity into conspiratorial communities by undermining their poor epistemology. Any legitimization effect might also be reduced by responding to more conspiracy theories rather than fewer.

However, presenting people with factual corrections, or highlighting the logical contradictions in conspiracy theories, has been demonstrated to have a positive effect in many circumstances. For example, this has been studied in the case of informing believers in 9/11 conspiracy theories about statements by actual experts and witnesses. One possibility is that criticism is most likely to backfire if it challenges someone's worldview or identity. This suggests that an effective approach may be to provide criticism while avoiding such challenges.

Psychology 
The widespread belief in conspiracy theories has become a topic of interest for sociologists, psychologists, and experts in folklore since at least the 1960s, when a number of conspiracy theories arose regarding the assassination of U.S. President John F. Kennedy. Sociologist Türkay Salim Nefes underlines the political nature of conspiracy theories. He suggests that one of the most important characteristics of these accounts is their attempt to unveil the "real but hidden" power relations in social groups. The term "conspiracism" was popularized by academic Frank P. Mintz in the 1980s. According to Mintz, conspiracism denotes "belief in the primacy of conspiracies in the unfolding of history":

Research suggests, on a psychological level, conspiracist ideation—belief in conspiracy theories—can be harmful or pathological, and is highly correlated with psychological projection, as well as with paranoia, which is predicted by the degree of a person's Machiavellianism. The propensity to believe in conspiracy theories is strongly associated with the mental health disorder of schizotypy. Conspiracy theories once limited to fringe audiences have become commonplace in mass media, emerging as a cultural phenomenon of the late 20th and early 21st centuries. Exposure to conspiracy theories in news media and popular entertainment increases receptiveness to conspiratorial ideas, and has also increased the social acceptability of fringe beliefs.

Conspiracy theories often make use of complicated and detailed arguments, including ones which appear to be analytical or scientific. However, belief in conspiracy theories is primarily driven by emotion. One of the most widely confirmed facts about conspiracy theories is that belief in a single conspiracy theory tends to promote belief in other unrelated conspiracy theories as well. This even applies when the conspiracy theories directly contradict each other, e.g. believing that Osama bin Laden was already dead before his compound in Pakistan was attacked makes the same person more likely to believe that he is still alive. One conclusion from this finding is that the content of a conspiracist belief is less important than the idea of a coverup by the authorities. Analytical thinking aids in reducing belief in conspiracy theories, in part because it emphasizes rational and critical cognition.

Some psychological scientists assert that explanations related to conspiracy theories can be, and often are "internally consistent" with strong beliefs that had previously been held prior to the event that sparked the conspiracy. People who believe in conspiracy theories tend to believe in other unsubstantiated claims – including pseudoscience and paranormal phenomena.

Attractions

Psychological motives for believing in conspiracy theories can be categorized as epistemic, existential, or social. These motives are particularly acute in vulnerable and disadvantaged populations. However, it does not appear that the beliefs help to address these motives; in fact, they may be self-defeating, acting to make the situation worse instead. For example, while conspiratorial beliefs can result from a perceived sense of powerlessness, exposure to conspiracy theories immediately suppresses personal feelings of autonomy and control. Furthermore, they also make people less likely to take actions that could improve their circumstances.

This is additionally supported by the fact that conspiracy theories have a number of disadvantageous attributes. For example, they promote a negative and distrustful view of other people and groups, who are allegedly acting based on antisocial and cynical motivations. This is expected to lead to increased alienation and anomie, and reduced social capital. Similarly, they depict the public as ignorant and powerless against the alleged conspirators, with important aspects of society determined by malevolent forces, a viewpoint which is likely to be disempowering.

Each person may endorse conspiracy theories for one of many different reasons. The most consistently demonstrated characteristics of people who find conspiracy theories appealing are a feeling of alienation, unhappiness or dissatisfaction with their situation, an unconventional worldview, and a feeling of disempowerment. While various aspects of personality affect susceptibility to conspiracy theories, none of the Big Five personality traits are associated with conspiracy beliefs.

The political scientist Michael Barkun, discussing the usage of "conspiracy theory" in contemporary American culture, holds that this term is used for a belief that explains an event as the result of a secret plot by exceptionally powerful and cunning conspirators to achieve a malevolent end. According to Barkun, the appeal of conspiracism is threefold:

 First, conspiracy theories claim to explain what institutional analysis cannot. They appear to make sense out of a world that is otherwise confusing. 
 Second, they do so in an appealingly simple way, by dividing the world sharply between the forces of light, and the forces of darkness. They trace all evil back to a single source, the conspirators and their agents. 
 Third, conspiracy theories are often presented as special, secret knowledge unknown or unappreciated by others. For conspiracy theorists, the masses are a brainwashed herd, while the conspiracy theorists in the know can congratulate themselves on penetrating the plotters' deceptions."

This third point is supported by research of Roland Imhoff, professor in Social Psychology at the Johannes Gutenberg University Mainz. The research suggests that the smaller the minority believing in a specific theory, the more attractive it is to conspiracy theorists.

Humanistic psychologists argue that even if a posited cabal behind an alleged conspiracy is almost always perceived as hostile, there often remains an element of reassurance for theorists. This is because it is a consolation to imagine that difficulties in human affairs are created by humans, and remain within human control. If a cabal can be implicated, there may be a hope of breaking its power or of joining it. Belief in the power of a cabal is an implicit assertion of human dignity—an unconscious affirmation that man is responsible for his own destiny.

People formulate conspiracy theories to explain, for example, power relations in social groups and the perceived existence of evil forces. Proposed psychological origins of conspiracy theorising include projection; the personal need to explain "a significant event [with] a significant cause;" and the product of various kinds and stages of thought disorder, such as paranoid disposition, ranging in severity to diagnosable mental illnesses. Some people prefer socio-political explanations over the insecurity of encountering random, unpredictable, or otherwise inexplicable events.

According to Berlet and Lyons, "Conspiracism is a particular narrative form of scapegoating that frames demonized enemies as part of a vast insidious plot against the common good, while it valorizes the scapegoater as a hero for sounding the alarm".

Origins
Some psychologists believe that a search for meaning is common in conspiracism. Once cognized, confirmation bias and avoidance of cognitive dissonance may reinforce the belief. In a context where a conspiracy theory has become embedded within a social group, communal reinforcement may also play a part.

Inquiry into possible motives behind the accepting of irrational conspiracy theories has linked these beliefs to distress resulting from an event that occurred, such as the events of 9/11. Additionally, research done by Manchester Metropolitan University suggests that "delusional ideation" is the most likely condition that would indicate an elevated belief in conspiracy theories. Studies also show that an increased attachment to these irrational beliefs lead to a decrease in desire for civic engagement. Belief in conspiracy theories is correlated with low intelligence, lower analytical thinking, anxiety disorders, paranoia, and authoritarian beliefs.

Professor Quassim Cassam argues that conspiracy theorists hold their beliefs due to flaws in their thinking and more precisely, their intellectual character. He cites philosopher Linda Trinkaus Zagzebski and her book Virtues of the Mind in outlining intellectual virtues (such as humility, caution and carefulness) and intellectual vices (such as gullibility, carelessness and closed-mindedness). Whereas intellectual virtues help in reaching sound examination, intellectual vices "impede effective and responsible inquiry", meaning that those who are prone to believing in conspiracy theories possess certain vices while lacking necessary virtues.

Some researchers have suggested that conspiracy theories could be partially caused by psychological mechanisms the human brain possesses for detecting dangerous coalitions. Such a mechanism could have been useful in the small-scale environment humanity evolved in but are mismatched in a modern, complex society and thus "misfire", perceiving conspiracies where none exist.

Projection
Some historians have argued that psychological projection is prevalent amongst conspiracy theorists. This projection, according to the argument, is manifested in the form of attribution of undesirable characteristics of the self to the conspirators. Historian Richard Hofstadter stated that:

Hofstadter also noted that "sexual freedom" is a vice frequently attributed to the conspiracist's target group, noting that "very often the fantasies of true believers reveal strong sadomasochistic outlets, vividly expressed, for example, in the delight of anti-Masons with the cruelty of Masonic punishments."

Sociology
In addition to psychological factors such as conspiracist ideation, sociological factors also help account for who believes in which conspiracy theories. Such theories tend to get more traction among election losers in society, for example, and the emphasis of conspiracy theories by elites and leaders tends to increase belief among followers who have higher levels of conspiracy thinking.

Christopher Hitchens described conspiracy theories as the "exhaust fumes of democracy": the unavoidable result of a large amount of information circulating among a large number of people.

Conspiracy theories may be emotionally satisfying, by assigning blame to a group to which the theorist does not belong and so absolving the theorist of moral or political responsibility in society. Likewise, Roger Cohen writing for The New York Times has said that, "captive minds; ... resort to conspiracy theory because it is the ultimate refuge of the powerless. If you cannot change your own life, it must be that some greater force controls the world."

Sociological historian Holger Herwig found in studying German explanations for the origins of World War I, "Those events that are most important are hardest to understand because they attract the greatest attention from myth makers and charlatans."

Justin Fox of Time magazine argues that Wall Street traders are among the most conspiracy-minded group of people, and ascribes this to the reality of some financial market conspiracies, and to the ability of conspiracy theories to provide necessary orientation in the market's day-to-day movements.

Influence of critical theory
French sociologist Bruno Latour suggests that the widespread popularity of conspiracy theories in mass culture may be due, in part, to the pervasive presence of Marxist-inspired critical theory and similar ideas in academia since the 1970s.

Latour notes that about 90% of contemporary social criticism in academia displays one of two approaches, which he terms "the fact position and the fairy position".

 The "fairy position" is anti-fetishist, arguing that "objects of belief" (e.g., religion, arts) are merely concepts onto which power is projected; Latour contends that those who use this approach show biases towards confirming their own dogmatic suspicions as most "scientifically supported". While the complete facts of the situation and correct methodology are ostensibly important to them, Latour proposes that the scientific process is instead laid on as a patina to one's pet theories to lend a sort of reputation high ground.
 The "fact position" argues that external forces (e.g., economics, gender) dominate individuals, often covertly and without their awareness.

Latour concludes that each of these two approaches in academia has led to a polarized, inefficient atmosphere highlighted (in both approaches) by its causticness. "Do you see now why it feels so good to be a critical mind?" asks Latour: no matter which position you take, "You're always right!"

Latour notes that such social criticism has been appropriated by those he describes as conspiracy theorists, including climate-change denialists and the 9/11 Truth movement: "Maybe I am taking conspiracy theories too seriously, but I am worried to detect, in those mad mixtures of knee-jerk disbelief, punctilious demands for proofs, and free use of powerful explanation from the social neverland, many of the weapons of social critique."

Fusion paranoia
Michael Kelly, a The Washington Post journalist and critic of anti-war movements on both the left and right, coined the term "fusion paranoia" to refer to a political convergence of left-wing and right-wing activists around anti-war issues and civil liberties, which he said were motivated by a shared belief in conspiracism or shared anti-government views.

Barkun has adopted this term to refer to how the synthesis of paranoid conspiracy theories, which were once limited to American fringe audiences, has given them mass appeal and enabled them to become commonplace in mass media, thereby inaugurating an unrivaled period of people actively preparing for apocalyptic or millenarian scenarios in the United States of the late 20th and early 21st centuries. Barkun notes the occurrence of lone-wolf conflicts with law enforcement acting as proxy for threatening the established political powers.

Viability 
As evidence that undermines an alleged conspiracy grows, the number of alleged conspirators also grows in the minds of conspiracy theorists. This is because of an assumption that the alleged conspirators often have competing interests. For example, if Republican President George W. Bush is allegedly responsible for the 9/11 terrorist attacks, and the Democratic party did not pursue exposing this alleged plot, that must mean that both the Democratic and Republican parties are conspirators in the alleged plot. It also assumes that the alleged conspirators are so competent that they can fool the entire world, but so incompetent that even the unskilled conspiracy theorists can find mistakes they make that prove the fraud. At some point, the number of alleged conspirators, combined with the contradictions within the alleged conspirators' interests and competence, becomes so great that maintaining the theory becomes an obvious exercise in absurdity.

The physicist David Robert Grimes estimated the time it would take for a conspiracy to be exposed based on the number of people involved. His calculations used data from the PRISM surveillance program, the Tuskegee syphilis experiment, and the FBI forensic scandal. Grimes estimated that:
 A Moon landing hoax would require the involvement of 411,000 people and would be exposed within 3.68 years;
 Climate-change fraud would require a minimum of 29,083 people (published climate scientists only) and would be exposed within 26.77 years, or up to 405,000 people, in which case it would be exposed within 3.70 years;
 A vaccination conspiracy would require a minimum of 22,000 people (without drug companies) and would be exposed within at least 3.15 years and at most 34.78 years depending on the number involved;
 A conspiracy to suppress a cure for cancer would require 714,000 people and would be exposed within 3.17 years.
Grimes's study did not consider exposure by sources outside of the alleged conspiracy. It only considered exposure from within the alleged conspiracy through whistleblowers or through incompetence.

Terminology

The term "truth seeker" is adopted by some conspiracy theorists when describing themselves on social media.

Conspiracy theorists are often referred to derogatorily as "cookers" in Australia. The term is also loosely associated with the far right.

Politics

The philosopher Karl Popper described the central problem of conspiracy theories as a form of fundamental attribution error, where every event is generally perceived as being intentional and planned, greatly underestimating the effects of randomness and unintended consequences. In his book The Open Society and Its Enemies, he used the term "the conspiracy theory of society" to denote the idea that social phenomena such as "war, unemployment, poverty, shortages ... [are] the result of direct design by some powerful individuals and groups." Popper argued that totalitarianism was founded on conspiracy theories which drew on imaginary plots which were driven by paranoid scenarios predicated on tribalism, chauvinism, or racism. He also noted that conspirators very rarely achieved their goal.

Historically, real conspiracies have usually had little effect on history and have had unforeseen consequences for the conspirators, in contrast to conspiracy theories which often posit grand, sinister organizations, or world-changing events, the evidence for which has been erased or obscured. As described by Bruce Cumings, history is instead "moved by the broad forces and large structures of human collectivities".

Middle East

Conspiracy theories are a prevalent feature of Arab culture and politics. Variants include conspiracies involving colonialism, Zionism, superpowers, oil, and the war on terrorism, which may be referred to as a war against Islam. For example,  The Protocols of the Elders of Zion, an infamous hoax document purporting to be a Jewish plan for world domination, is commonly read and promoted in the Muslim world. Roger Cohen has suggested that the popularity of conspiracy theories in the Arab world is "the ultimate refuge of the powerless". Al-Mumin Said has noted the danger of such theories, for they "keep us not only from the truth but also from confronting our faults and problems".

Osama bin Laden and Ayman al-Zawahiri have used conspiracy theories about the United States to gain support for al-Qaeda in the Arab world, and as rhetoric to distinguish themselves from similar groups, although they may not have believed the conspiratorial claims themselves.

United States

The historian Richard Hofstadter addressed the role of paranoia and conspiracism throughout U.S. history in his 1964 essay "The Paranoid Style in American Politics". Bernard Bailyn's classic The Ideological Origins of the American Revolution (1967) notes that a similar phenomenon could be found in North America during the time preceding the American Revolution. Conspiracism labels people's attitudes as well as the type of conspiracy theories that are more global and historical in proportion.

Harry G. West and others have noted that while conspiracy theorists may often be dismissed as a fringe minority, certain evidence suggests that a wide range of the U.S. maintains a belief in conspiracy theories. West also compares those theories to hypernationalism and religious fundamentalism.

Theologian Robert Jewett and philosopher John Shelton Lawrence attribute the enduring popularity of conspiracy theories in the U.S. to the Cold War, McCarthyism, and counterculture rejection of authority. They state that among both the left-wing and right-wing, there remains a willingness to use real events, such as Soviet plots, inconsistencies in the Warren Report, and the 9/11 attacks, to support the existence of unverified and ongoing large-scale conspiracies.

In his studies of "American political demonology," historian Michael Paul Rogin too analyzed this paranoid style of politics that has occurred throughout American history. Conspiracy theories frequently identify an imaginary subversive group that is supposedly attacking the nation and requires the government and allied forces to engage in harsh extra-legal repression of those threatening subversives. Rogin cites examples from the Red Scares of 1919, to McCarthy's anti-communist campaign in the 1950s and more recently fears of immigrant hordes invading the US. Unlike Hofstadter, Rogin saw these "countersubversive" fears as frequently coming from those in power and dominant groups, instead of from the dispossessed. Unlike Robert Jewett, Rogin blamed not the counterculture, but America's dominant culture of liberal individualism and the fears it stimulated to explain the periodic eruption of irrational conspiracy theories.

The Watergate scandal has also been used to bestow legitimacy to other conspiracy theories, with Richard Nixon himself commenting that it served as a "Rorschach ink blot" which invited others to fill in the underlying pattern.

Historian Kathryn S. Olmsted cites three reasons why Americans are prone to believing in government conspiracies theories:
Genuine government overreach and secrecy during the Cold War, such as Watergate, the Tuskegee syphilis experiment, Project MKUltra, and the CIA's assassination attempts on Fidel Castro in collaboration with mobsters.
Precedent set by official government-sanctioned conspiracy theories for propaganda, such as claims of German infiltration of the U.S. during World War II or the debunked claim that Saddam Hussein played a role in the 9/11 attacks.
Distrust fostered by the government's spying on and harassment of dissenters, such as the Sedition Act of 1918, COINTELPRO, and as part of various Red Scares.

Alex Jones referenced numerous conspiracy theories for convincing his supporters to endorse Ron Paul over Mitt Romney in the 2012 Republican Party presidential primaries and Donald Trump over Hillary Clinton in the 2016 United States presidential election. Into the 2020s, the QAnon conspiracy theory alleges that Trump is fighting against a deep-state cabal of child sex-abusing and Satan-worshipping Democrats.

See also

References
Informational notes

Citations

Further reading
 
 
 Burnett, Thom. Conspiracy Encyclopedia: The Encyclopedia of Conspiracy Theories
 Butter, Michael, and Peter Knight. "Bridging the great divide: conspiracy theory research for the 21st century." Diogenes (2016): 0392192116669289. online
 
 
 
 
 De Graaf, Beatrice and Zwierlein, Cornel (eds.) Security and Conspiracy in History, 16th to 21st Century. Historical Social Research 38, Special Issue, 2013
 Fleming, Chris and Emma A. Jane. Modern Conspiracy: The Importance of Being Paranoid. New York and London: Bloomsbury, 2014. .
 Goertzel, Ted. "Belief in conspiracy theories." Political Psychology (1994): 731–742. online
 Harris, Lee. "The Trouble with Conspiracy Theories". The American, 12 January 2013.
 Hofstadter, Richard. The paranoid style in American politics (1954). online
 
 
 
 
 
 
 Oliver, J. Eric, and Thomas J. Wood. "Conspiracy theories and the paranoid style (s) of mass opinion." American Journal of Political Science 58.4 (2014): 952–966.online
 
 
 
 
 
 Slosson, W. "The 'Conspiracy' Superstition". The Unpopular Review, Vol. VII, N°. 14, 1917.
 Sunstein, Cass R., and Adrian Vermeule. "Conspiracy theories: Causes and cures." Journal of Political Philosophy 17.2 (2009): 202–227. online
 Uscinski, Joseph E. and Joseph M. Parent, American Conspiracy Theories (2014) excerpt
 Uscinski, Joseph E. "The 5 Most Dangerous Conspiracy Theories of 2016" POLITICO Magazine (Aug 22, 2016)
 
 Wood, Gordon S. "Conspiracy and the paranoid style: causality and deceit in the eighteenth century." William and Mary Quarterly (1982): 402–441. in jstor

External links

 Conspiracy Theories, Internet Encyclopedia of Philosophy

 
Barriers to critical thinking
Fringe theory
Pejorative terms